The following lists events that happened during 1907 in Liberia.

Incumbents
President: Arthur Barclay 
Vice President: James Jenkins Dossen
Chief Justice: Zacharia B. Roberts

Events

January
 January 2 – The Liberian National Bar Association is officially launched.

May
 May 7 – Liberian constitutional referendum, 1907

References

 
Years of the 20th century in Liberia
Liberia
Liberia